António João Ferradeira Santos (born 30 September 1992), commonly known as Tó Barbosa, is a Portuguese former professional footballer who played as a forward.

References

External links

1992 births
Living people
People from Vila do Conde
Portuguese footballers
Association football forwards
Primeira Liga players
Liga Portugal 2 players
Segunda Divisão players
Gil Vicente F.C. players
Varzim S.C. players
Portugal youth international footballers
Portugal under-21 international footballers
Sportspeople from Porto District